Spring Valley is a census-designated place (CDP) in the East County region of San Diego County, California. The population was 28,205 at the 2010 census.

From 1970 through 1990, Spring Valley included what is now the La Presa CDP to the south; La Presa is still popularly considered to be a part of Spring Valley. Extended definitions of Spring Valley may also include the Casa de Oro neighborhood to the north, which belongs to the Casa de Oro-Mount Helix CDP. Locations in both La Presa and Casa de Oro use Spring Valley addresses.

Spring Valley is served by the 91977 and 91978 ZIP codes.

History
Spring Valley is named for the natural spring located there. It was long the home of the Kumeyaay people, who called it Neti or Meti. Spanish conquerors drove off the natives and used the area for cattle, calling it El aguaje de San Jorge (St. George's Spring).

In 1863 Judge Augustus S. Ensworth of San Diego filed a claim for a 160-acre (65 ha) ranch that included the spring. The ranch, and the small adobe house he built there, were sold to Rufus King Porter and later to historian Hubert Howe Bancroft. The adobe is now a National Historic Landmark.

Geography
The United States Geological Survey (USGS) places Spring Valley at  (32.7447740, 	 -116.9989160). This is near the intersection of Kenwood Drive and Helix Street. Most maps place Spring Valley at this location.

The United States Census Bureau places Spring Valley at  (32.734318, -116.981372), which is approximately two miles southeast of where the USGS places it.

Demographics

2010
At the 2010 census Spring Valley had a population of 28,205. The racial makeup of Spring Valley was 10,915 (38.7%) White, 3,449 (11.1%) African American, 237 (0.8%) Native American, 1,766 (5.7%) Asian, 616 (2.0%) Pacific Islander, 5,172 (17.4%) from other races, and 1,828 (6.5%) from two or more races. Hispanic or Latino of any race were 11,201 persons (36.0%).

The census reported that 28,040 people (99.4% of the population) lived in households, 51 (0.2%) lived in non-institutionalized group quarters, and 114 (0.4%) were institutionalized.

There were 9,305 households, 3,854 (41.4%) had children under the age of 18 living in them, 4,940 (53.1%) were opposite-sex married couples living together, 1,514 (16.3%) had a female householder with no husband present, 636 (6.8%) had a male householder with no wife present.  There were 560 (6.0%) unmarried opposite-sex partnerships, and 96 (1.0%) same-sex married couples or partnerships. 1,612 households (17.3%) were one person and 560 (6.0%) had someone living alone who was 65 or older. The average household size was 3.01.  There were 7,090 families (76.2% of households); the average family size was 3.39.

The age distribution was 7,481 people (26.5%) under the age of 18, 2,819 people (10.0%) aged 18 to 24, 7,496 people (26.6%) aged 25 to 44, 7,461 people (26.5%) aged 45 to 64, and 2,948 people (10.5%) who were 65 or older.  The median age was 35.0 years. For every 100 females, there were 95.2 males.  For every 100 females age 18 and over, there were 90.6 males.

There were 9,741 housing units at an average density of 1,321.0 per square mile, of the occupied units 5,916 (63.6%) were owner-occupied and 3,389 (36.4%) were rented. The homeowner vacancy rate was 1.9%; the rental vacancy rate was 4.9%.  17,130 people (60.7% of the population) lived in owner-occupied housing units and 10,910 people (38.7%) lived in rental housing units.

2000

The United States Census Bureau has split Spring Valley (in its greater sense) into two Census-Designated Places (CDPs). The statistics below cover only the Spring Valley CDP. For the demographics of the complete community of Spring Valley also see La Presa, California.

At the 2000 census there were 26,663 people, 9,129 households, and 6,901 families in the CDP. The population density was 3,685.4 inhabitants per square mile (1,423.9/km). The racial makeup of the CDP was 45.6% White, 10.7% African American, 0.8% Native American, 4.8% Asian, 1.2% Pacific Islander, 12.4% from other races, and 6.2% from two or more races. Hispanic or Latino of any race were 30.1%.

Of the 9,129 households 40.5% had children under the age of 18 living with them, 54.8% were married couples living together, 15.6% had a female householder with no husband present, and 24.4% were non-families. 17.5% of households were one person and 6.0% were one person aged 65 or older.  The average household size was 2.90 and the average family size was 3.27.

The age distribution was 29.1% under the age of 18, 9.1% from 18 to 24, 31.4% from 25 to 44, 20.9% from 45 to 64, and 9.5% 65 or older.  The median age was 33 years. For every 100 females, there were 94.8 males.  For every 100 females age 18 and over, there were 91.6 males.

The median household income was $48,271 and the median family income  was $51,217. Males had a median income of $36,338 versus $30,297 for females. The per capita income for the CDP was $19,504.  About 6.5% of families and 8.6% of the population were below the poverty line, including 11.3% of those under age 18 and 3.2% of those age 65 or over.

Education
Public high school education is provided by the Grossmont Union High School District. Elementary and middle schools are run by the La Mesa-Spring Valley School District.

Government

Notable people
Khalif Barnes - football player
Reggie Bush - football player
Nick Cannon - comedian/actor
Brooks Conrad - baseball player
Jean Dawson - musician
Robert Griffith - football player
Cory Littleton - football player
Ogemdi Nwagbuo - NFL Athlete
Cal Rayborn - professional motorcycle racer
Michael Wiley - football player
Doug Wilkerson - football player

References

External links
Spring Valley Chamber of Commerce

Census-designated places in San Diego County, California
East County (San Diego County)
Valleys of San Diego County, California
Census-designated places in California